= Breekout Krew =

Breakout Krew
- Origin: United States
- Genres: Pop music
- Years active: 1984
- Labels: London Records

Breakout Krew was an American male vocal duo, which had a single called "Matt's Mood", in the UK Singles Chart. It was released on the London Records label, entered the chart on 24 November 1984, and rose to a high of number 51; it remained in the charts for three weeks.
